TOTP may refer to:

 Top of the Pops, a British music chart television programme
 Time-based one-time password, algorithm in computer security

See also
 Top of the Pops (disambiguation)